Mankind is a term that refers collectively to all humans. Some prefer the term "humankind" to more accurately include women, while others still prefer to use the term “mankind” which etymologically refers to both males and females.

Mankind may also refer to:

 Mankind, a ringname/gimmick used by Mick Foley (born 1965) during parts of his tenure in World Wrestling Federation/World Wrestling Entertainment
 Mankind (play), a 15th-century morality play
 Mankind (video game), a 1998 massively multiplayer online real-time strategy game
 Mankind (album), an album by Factory 81
 Mankind: The Story of All of Us, a 2012 American documentary series
 ManKind Initiative, a domestic violence charity
 ManKind Project, a non-profit, educational organization
 "Mankind", a song by Pearl Jam from No Code
 Mankind (band), a disco band
The Australian Journal of Anthropology, formerly known as Mankind

See also

 Humanity (disambiguation)
 For All Mankind (disambiguation)